Santiago Chimaltenango is a town and municipality in the Guatemalan department of Huehuetenango. The municipality is named in honor of the Apostle St James. The annual celebrations (fiestas patronales) are from July 21 to July 25. It is estimated that roughly 10% of the population is abroad, mainly in the American states of California and Florida. The cities of Oakland and Los Angeles having the largest populations. The Mam people are the predominant people in the municipality. The Mam language is widely spoken in it.

Contents

History 

The municipality was annulled on December 11, 1935, and reestablished on February 2, 1948.

The predominant language is mam. Specificity the Northern Mam.(Diccionario Municipal de Guatemala, 2001).

Government 

The current mayor of the municipality for the 2020-2024 cycle is Froylan Elías Aguilar Jiménez (Partido UNE).

Education

Economy 

The production of agriculture of the municipality includes corn, beans, potatoes, coffee, sugar cane and bananas (Diccionario Municipal de Guatemala, 2001).

Its production of local artisanal wears include cotton and wool (Diccionario Municipal de Guatemala, 2001).

Geography 

The municipality is bound to the north by the municipalities of Concepción and Todos Santos Cuchumatán. To the east by the municipality of San Juan Atitán. To the south is the municipality Colotenango and then the west with the municipalities of Colotenango and San Pedro Nécta.

It is located about 317 km from the capital of Guatemala City.

The weather is cool and moderate.

Transportation

Tourism 

In the municipality is the archeological site of Tecpán.
Also the tourist site of the Balñeario La Laguna (La Laguna Waterpark)

(Diccionario Municipal de Guatemala, 2001).

Demographics 

According to projections by the “Instituto Nacional de Estadística“ for the year 2012, The municipality of Santiago Chimaltenango has a population of 7,250 inhabitants.

Traditional Music 

The area has its own distinct type of marimba music.

For example, the marimba La Unica Chimalteca.

References

Municipalities of the Huehuetenango Department